The cabinet of Đorđe Petrović, more commonly known as Karađorđe, was formed on 11 January 1811. It held office until 3 October 1813, when Karađorđe fled to the Austrian Empire after the defeat of Revolutionary Serbia in the First Serbian Uprising. It was succeeded by the second cabinet of Mladen Milovanović, which briefly acted in exile.

Timeline 

On 11 January 1811, Karađorđe entered the Assembly of Uprising Champions and removed Jakov Nenadović and his cabinet from power by proclaiming a constitutional act that would ensure him absolute military and political power. Soon after, the government recognized pledged to his "lawful heirs", while Karađorđe also adopted the title of a Supreme Leader. Additionally, Karađorđe governed a highly centralized government.

Karađorđe conducted radical restructuring of local governments, especially regarding the military. The areas that were once controlled by vojvodas were now fragmented into smaller military-administrative units which limited the power of vojvodas. His power was though kept in check by his cabinet and rivals.

Composition
The government was now composed of ministries. Karađorđe appointed his supporters and opponents to the cabinet. Petar Dobrnjac and Milenko Stojković, who were initially supposed to serve in the cabinet, declined due to fearing that by accepting the positions, Karađorđe's power would be legitimized. In response, Karađorđe exiled them to Wallachia.

Aftermath 
Karađorđe's reforms to the military led to the collapse of Revolutionary Serbia in 1813. He fled to the Austrian Empire on 3 October, while Belgrade, where the government's headquarters were located, fell to the Ottoman Empire later that month.

References

Serbia
1811 establishments in Serbia
1813 disestablishments in Serbia
Cabinets established in 1811
Cabinets disestablished in 1813
Political history of Serbia